Statistics of Austrian Staatsliga A in the 1955–56 season.

Overview
It was contested by 14 teams, and SK Rapid Wien won the championship.

League standings

Results

References
Austria - List of final tables (RSSSF)

Austrian Football Bundesliga seasons
Austria
1955–56 in Austrian football